Olaya is a town and municipality located in the western region of the Department of Antioquia in the Republic of Colombia. It borders to the north with the municipality of Liborina, to the east with the municipalities of Belmira and Sopetrán and to the South with Sopetrán and by the West with the municipality of Santa Fe de Antioquia.  

Olaya is 100 kilometers away from the city of Medellín, capital of the Department of Antioquia. It has an area of 90 km², and is the smallest municipality in the department. Olaya is also one of the oldest municipalities of Antioquia.

External links

Municipalities of Antioquia Department